How to Get Rid of Your Wife (transliterated as “Kayf tatakhalas min zawjatik”) is an Egyptian romantic comedy film released in 1969. It was directed by Abdel Monem Shokry, features a script by Bahgat Kamar, and stars Hassan Youssef, Zubaida Tharwat, Hassan Mustafa, Mimi Gamal, Fathia Shaheen, and Nawal Hashem.

Synopsis
Magdy (Hassan Youssef) is a famous movie star and a notorious womanizer. His friend, a famous author named Fikri Khafagy (Hassan Mustafa), helps write a speech he can use to break up with clingy women, which Magdy tries out on a lawyer named Suhair (Mimi Gamal and a dentist named Nadia (Shahinaz). Magdy fears that he would lose fans if he were to marry. At one of the wrap parties for his last movie in a night, Magdy meets a woman named Samiya (Zubaida Tharwat), with whom he dances, drinks, passes out, and wakes up in bed the next morning asking her to leave, only for her to show him a marriage contract between them. 

He and Fikri decide that Magdy cook up several schemes to call it off, the first of which is to warn her that he has a contagious disease (named here from the Arabic word for “ivy”), but her effort to send a doctor to make a house call risks the plan. Second, Magdy sets up a fake honeymoon in an abandoned, secluded house to terrorize her with the squabbles of a masked gang including Dabouk (Hamdy Salem, Hillah (Ali Muhammad), and Fokak (Hassan Totala); Samiya turns them in to a police officer (Mukhtar Al-Sayed), who thanks Magdy for the “help” apprehending them. Third, the duo slip testosterone into a drink to try and make her masculine, briefly hoarsening and deepening her voice, but the effect wears off quickly.

Warned by Suhair about Magdy’s duplicity, Samiya threatens to sue for infidelity with the publicity far more of a threat than any legal penalty, and this leads Magdy to acquiesce to Samiya’s requests to be her live-in butler essentially, doing household chores such as cooking and cleaning. In a last-ditch attempt to scotch the marriage, Magdy makes a deal to fake his death with Fikri framing Samiya as the shooter and helping her flee to Abu Qir. Suhair informs Samiya, who finally sends Magdy the divorce papers. But afterwards, Magdy misses her and falls in love, searching for her only to find her beside her mother (Fathia Shaheen) and engaged resolutely to her cousin Hanafi (Ahmed Maher Tekha). Suhair informs her soon that Magdy has attempted suicide, prompting police to swarm and Samiya to come back to him and reunite happily ever after.

Cast and crew

Crew
 Abdel Monem Shokry (director)
 Bahgat Kamar (writer)

Cast
 Hassan Youssef (Magdy) 
 Zubaida Tharwat (Samiya) 
 Hassan Mustafa (Fikri) 
 Mimi Gamal (Suhair) 
 Fathia Shaheen (Samiya’s mother)
 Shahinaz (Nadia) 
 Soheir Zaki
 Hassan Totala
 Ali Muhammad
 Farouk El Tatawy
 Mukhtar Al-Sayed
 Nawal Hashem
 Ahmed Abo Abeya
 Ahmed Maher Tekha (Hanafi)
 Hamdy Salem

External links
 El Cinema page

References

Egyptian romance films
1969 films